Paw Paw, Paw paw, or pawpaw may refer to:

Plants and fruits
 Asimina, a genus of trees and shrubs native to eastern North America, commonly known as pawpaws
 Common pawpaw (Asimina triloba), a temperate fruit tree, native to eastern North America
 Papaya (Carica papaya),  a widely cultivated tropical fruit tree
 Mountain paw paw (Vasconcellea pubescens), a fruit tree native to South America

Places
In the United States
 Paw Paw, Illinois
 Paw Paw Township, DeKalb County, Illinois
 Paw Paw Township, Wabash County, Indiana
 Paw Paw, Indiana (Miami County)
 Paw Paw Township, Elk County, Kansas
 Paw Paw, Kentucky
 Paw Paw, Michigan
 Paw Paw Township, Michigan
 Paw Paw River, in Michigan
 Paw Paw, Missouri
 Paw Paw, Marion County, West Virginia
 Paw Paw, West Virginia, in Morgan County
 Paw Paw Creek, in Marion County and Monongalia County, West Virginia
 List of lakes named Paw Paw Lake

Other uses
 Paw Paw High School (disambiguation)
 Paw Paw Railroad (Michigan), a defunct railroad which operated in Van Buren County, Michigan, between 1857 and 1887
 Paw Paw Tunnel, in Maryland
 "paw-paw French", a nickname of the Missouri French

See also
 Pawpawsaurus, or pawpaw Lizard, a dinosaur
 Paw Paws, a television cartoon series
 "pawpaw" may be an affectionate term for a grandfather